Glencoe is an unincorporated community in Alamance County, North Carolina, United States on North Carolina Highway 62, north-northeast of downtown Burlington.

It is located on the Haw River. Glencoe is located north of Morgantown, and west-northwest of Carolina, a neighboring unincorporated settlement also on the Haw River. Glencoe is also home to Textile Mill Town, and Textile Heritage Museum.

The Glencoe Mill Village Historic District and Glencoe School are listed on the National Register of Historic Places.

References

External links
 Glencoe Mill Village, Preservation North Carolina
 Textile Heritage Museum at Glencoe, North Carolina
 Glencoe Research Forum

Unincorporated communities in Alamance County, North Carolina
Unincorporated communities in North Carolina